The Red Horses (Swedish: De röda hästarna) is a 1954 Swedish sports drama film directed by Ivar Johansson and starring Gun Arvidsson, Jan-Erik Lindqvist and Rut Holm. It is a remake of the 1950 Danish film The Red Horses, itself based on a 1943 novel by Morten Korch. It was shot at Svensk Talfilm's studios in Malmö and Täby. Location shooting took place around Malmö including Jägersro, Solvalla and Hörby.

Cast
 Gun Arvidsson as 	Margit Törner
 Jan-Erik Lindqvist as Bertil Hagert 
 Rut Holm as 	Louise
 Artur Rolén as 	Ludde Mårtenson
 Harry Persson as 	Olle Olsson
 Inger Juel as 	Ulla Cronstam
 Hugo Björne as 	Hjalmar Hagert
 Gösta Cederlund as 	Harald Friberg
 Ebba Ringdahl as Ester Törner
 Allan Bohlin as 	Willner
 Nils Fritz as Ester's Lawyer
 John Precht as 	Helge Törner
 Nils Johannisson as 	Doctor
 Margaretha Löwler as 	Gunnel Hagert
 Helen Jonson as 	Greta Friberg
 Anders Hellquist as Priest at Wedding

References

Bibliography 
 Qvist, Per Olov & von Bagh, Peter. Guide to the Cinema of Sweden and Finland. Greenwood Publishing Group, 2000.

External links 
 

1954 films
Swedish drama films
1954 drama films
1950s Swedish-language films
Films directed by Ivar Johansson
Swedish black-and-white films
Horse racing films
Films based on Danish novels
Remakes of Danish films
1950s Swedish films